The IT University of Copenhagen (Danish: IT-Universitetet i København, abbreviated ITU) is a public university and research institution in Copenhagen, Denmark. It is specialized in the multidisciplinary study of information technology within computer science, business IT and digital design.

There are approximately 200 faculty members, 70 PhD students and more than 2,500 students. Among all admitted Bachelor and Master students at the IT University of Copenhagen in 2020, 38 per cent were female.

History

The IT University of Copenhagen was established in 1999, which makes it Denmark's youngest university. At that time, it was—in Danish—called "IT-højskolen". In 2003, when a new Danish university law  was passed, the IT University was officially appointed a university, and changed its name accordingly.

In 2004, the university moved to its own new building in Ørestad, a newly developed area in Copenhagen on the island of Amager. The new building was designed by Danish architect Henning Larsen. The university is located right between the University of Copenhagen's new South Campus and the headquarters of the Danish Broadcasting Corporation (DR), and close to the DR Byen metro station. In 2020, the university extended its campus, taking over facilities in the neighboring DR complex.

Administration and Organisation

The IT University is governed by a board consisting of 9 members: 5 members recruited from outside of the university form the majority of the board, 1 member is appointed by the scientific staff, 1 member is appointed by the administrative staff, and 2 members are appointed by the university students. The Vice Chancellor is appointed by the university board. The Vice Chancellor in turn appoints deans and deans appoint heads of departments. There is no faculty senate and faculty is not involved in the appointment of Vice Chancellor, deans, or department heads.

The university has three departments:
 Business IT
 Computer Science
 Digital Design

Degree programs

The university originally only accepted students with a Bachelor's degree to its offered Master programs, but started its first Bachelor of Science program in Software Development in August 2007. As of 2018, the IT University offers four Bachelor programs (two of which are internationally oriented and taught in English), five Master study programs (two of which are internationally oriented and are taught in English), professional Master's study programs, a Diploma program, and approximately 100 courses each semester.

Research

The IT University takes a multidisciplinary approach to the study of information technology, drawing from a variety of academic perspectives. These include the natural sciences (traditional computer science), software engineering, data science, information economics, information systems, computational social science, science and technology studies (STS), CSCW, computer games studies, and the cultural and aesthetic aspects of IT.

The stated objective of the university's research is to strengthen Denmark's ability to create value with IT. The research aims to provide new insight that could be the foundation for new types of interaction, new breakthroughs in digital culture, better resource optimization, technological innovation and much more. An important part of the research conducted at the university is the PhD program that enrolls PhD students from all over the world.

The university's research practice is organized through a handful of research centres:
 Centre for Digital Play (former Center for Computer Games Research)
 Center for Computing Education Research
 Centre for Digital Welfare
 Centre for Information Security and Trust
 European Blockchain Center
 Danish Institute for IT Program Management

See also
 Open access in Denmark

References

External links
 ITU official website in English
 ITU official website in Danish

 
Higher education in Copenhagen
Universities in Denmark
Educational institutions established in 1999
Modernist architecture in Copenhagen
1999 establishments in Denmark
University and college campuses in Copenhagen